Paris Follies is a 2014 French comedy film written and directed by Marc Fitoussi. It stars Isabelle Huppert, Jean-Pierre Darroussin and Michael Nyqvist. It competed in the main competition section of the 36th Moscow International Film Festival.

Plot
Brigitte Lecanu lives on the countryside as the wife of a cattle breeder. During a party at the neighbour's Brigitte gets to know a younger man from Paris who adores her. Feeling flattered she pretends to have to visit a dermatologist in Paris. After her devotee has disappointed her she begins an affair with a Danish businessman. Her husband Xavier follows her to Paris, hoping to save their marriage.

Cast 
 Isabelle Huppert as Brigitte Lecanu
 Jean-Pierre Darroussin as Xavier Lecanu
 Michael Nyqvist as Jesper
 Pio Marmaï as Stan
 Marina Foïs as Christiane
 Audrey Dana as Laurette
 Anaïs Demoustier as Marion
 Clément Métayer as Grégoire
 Jean-Charles Clichet as Régis
 Lakshanta Abenayake as Apu
 Louise Coldefy as restaurant server

References

External links 
 

2014 films
2014 comedy films
2010s French-language films
French comedy films
Films directed by Marc Fitoussi
2010s French films